Yuki Yuna is a Hero is a Japanese anime television series directed by Seiji Kishi and produced by Studio Gokumi. The series follows a girl named Yuna Yuki who, along with her fellow members in her school's Hero Club, becomes an actual hero tasked with fighting an evil race known as the Vertex. The series was broadcast in Japan from October 17 to December 26, 2014 and was simulcast worldwide by Crunchyroll. In North America, the series is licensed by PonyCan USA, and it was released on Blu-ray/DVD in April 2015.

A second season aired in Japan between October 7, 2017 and January 6, 2018 and was simulcast by Anime Strike. The season is split into two parts; Washio Sumi's Chapter, which adapts the Washio Sumi is a Hero prequel light novel series, and Heroes' Chapter, which takes place after the first season. Washio Sumi's Chapter was first released as three theatrical films between March 18 and July 8, 2017, before airing as six television episodes between October 7 and November 11, 2017, followed by a recap episode which aired on November 18, 2017. Heroes' Chapter consists of six television episodes and aired between November 25, 2017 and January 6, 2018. Both series were simulcast by Amazon Prime Video. Three short films by W-Toon Studio based on the Yuki Yuna wa Yūsha-bu Shozoku spin-off manga by Takahiro and Kotamaru were released alongside the Washio Sumi films.

A third anime season titled , which takes place during the events of the second season and adapts content from the Kusunoki Mebuki is a Hero and Nogi Wakaba is a Hero light novels, aired from October 2 to December 18, 2021 on MBS, TBS, and their affiliates and is being simulcast by HIDIVE. The main staff and cast members reprised their roles for the third season.

Episode list

Season 1 (The Yuki Yuna Chapter)

Season 2

The Washio Sumi Chapter

The Hero Chapter

Season 3 (The Great Mankai Chapter)

Yuki Yuna is a Hero: Churutto!

Notes

References

Yuki Yuna is a Hero